Åsgreina or Åsgrenda is a village in Nannestad municipality, Norway. Its population as of 2005 was 603, including that of the nearby village of Slattumhagen.

References

Villages in Akershus